is a Japanese athlete. He competed in the men's long jump at the 1964 Summer Olympics.

References

1938 births
Living people
Athletes (track and field) at the 1964 Summer Olympics
Japanese male long jumpers
Olympic athletes of Japan
Place of birth missing (living people)